William Beau Mirchoff (born January 13, 1989) is a Canadian-American actor best known for his role in the MTV series Awkward, his role as Jamie Hunter in Good Trouble, and his role in Now Apocalypse on Starz.

Early life
Mirchoff was born in Seattle, Washington. Two days later, he moved to his family's home in Victoria, British Columbia.

Career
Mirchoff first got noticed for his role in the play Bubbly Stiltskin. His first feature was a supporting role in Scary Movie 4, playing 'Robbie Ryan'. He was a recurring character on the CBC series Heartland. He also landed a lead role in The Grudge 3. Mirchoff joined the cast of Desperate Housewives, playing Danny Bolen between 2009 and 2010. He had supporting roles in the indie film The Secret Lives of Dorks and in the film I Am Number Four. Mirchoff starred as a lead in the MTV series Awkward. He played the role of Dominic in the Disney Channel film The Wizards Return: Alex vs. Alex. Beau was also seen as a recurring character on NBC's period drama Aquarius and in indie thriller Poker Night opposite Ron Perlman and Giancarlo Esposito. He is now known for playing the role of Jamie Hunter on The Fosters and now more recently their sister show, Good Trouble.

Filmography

Film

Television

References

External links
 
 

21st-century American male actors
21st-century Canadian male actors
American emigrants to Canada
American male film actors
American male television actors
Canadian male film actors
Canadian male television actors
Living people
Male actors from Seattle
Male actors from Victoria, British Columbia
1989 births
American people of Canadian descent
Canadian people of American descent
American people of British descent
Canadian people of British descent
American people of Scottish descent
Canadian people of Scottish descent
American people of Irish descent
Canadian people of Irish descent
American people of English descent
Canadian people of English descent